The 2018 Angola Handball Super Cup (12th edition) was contested by Primeiro de Agosto, as the 2017 league champion and Interclube, the 2017 cup winner. Interclube won its 6th title.

The 2018 Women's Super Cup (12th edition) was contested by Primeiro de Agosto, the 2017 women's league champion and Petro de Luanda, the 2016 cup winner. Petro Atlético was the winner, making it is's 10th title.

 Stats

See also
 2017 Angola Women's Handball League
 2018 Supertaça de Angola (basketball)

References

Handball competitions in Angola
2007 establishments in Angola